Colin Steele may refer to:
 Colin Steele (trumpeter)
 Colin Steele (singer)